Lincoln Allison (born 5 October 1946 in Hartlepool) is an English academic and essayist.

Life and career
Allison grew up in Colne, Lancashire, and was educated at Royal Grammar School, Lancaster, and at University and Nuffield Colleges, Oxford. He was a research scholar at Stanford University before taking up a position at the University of Warwick, where he taught from 1969 to 2004. Retired from full-time teaching, he is now Emeritus Reader in Politics at the University of Warwick and Visiting Professor in the politics of sport at the University of Brighton.

He is most noted for his work on the politics of sport, for which he was awarded a D.Litt in 2003, but he has also produced books on a number of other topics and been a prolific writer for magazines and newspapers since the 1970s. 

He married Ann McDonnell in 1975; they have three sons.

Books
 Environmental Planning: A Political and Philosophical Analysis 1975
 Condition of England: Essays and Impressions 1981
 Right Principles: A Conservative Philosophy of Politics 1984
 The Politics of Sport (edited) 1986
 A Journey Quite Different: Collected Walks 1987
 The Utilitarian Response: Essays on the Contemporary Viability of Utilitarian Political Philosophy (edited) 1990
 Ecology and Utility: The Philosophical Dilemmas of Planetary Management 1991
 The Changing Politics of Sport (edited) 1993
 Taking Sport Seriously (edited) 1999
 Amateurism in Sport: An Analysis and a Defence 2000
 The Global Politics of Sport: The Role of Global Institutions in Sport 2005
 The Disrespect Agenda: Or How the Wrong Kind of Niceness Is Making Us Weak and Unhappy 2008
 My Father's Bookcase: A Version of the History of Ideas 2011
 Understanding International Sport Organisations: Principles, Power and Possibilities (with Alan Tomlinson) 2017

References

External links
 Personal website

1946 births
Living people
People educated at Lancaster Royal Grammar School
Alumni of University College, Oxford
Alumni of Nuffield College, Oxford
Academics of the University of Warwick
English essayists
People from Hartlepool